Loch Long is a body of water in Argyll and Bute, Scotland. The Sea Loch extends from the Firth of Clyde at its southwestern end. The loch also has an arm, Loch Goil, on its western side.

Although it is fairly long, its name actually comes from the Gaelic for "ship lake". Prior to their defeat at the Battle of Largs in 1263, Viking raiders sailed up Loch Long to Arrochar, and then dragged their longships 2 miles overland to Tarbet and into Loch Lomond. Being inland, the settlements around Loch Lomond were more vulnerable to attack.

Loch Long forms part of the coast of the Cowal peninsula and forms the entire western coastline of the Rosneath Peninsula.

Loch Long was historically the boundary between Argyll and Dunbartonshire; however, in 1996 boundary redrawing meant that it moved wholly within the council area of Argyll and Bute.

The steamboat Chancellor used to traverse the loch, departing Dunoon at 11:00 and returning about five hours later. PS Waverley was also built to serve Loch Long and Loch Goil from 1947, a route which she still sails today albeit as more of an attraction than a primary means of transport.

Villages on Loch Long

Villages on the loch include Arrochar at its head and Cove on the east shore near its foot.

Fisheries

Several Scottish sea fishing records are attributed to the loch:

Sport

The Ardentinny Outdoor Education Centre on the western shore uses the loch for watersports.

It is now a popular area for diving on the numerous wrecks that scatter the loch.

Finnart Oil Terminal

The Finnart Oil Terminal is located on the eastern shore of the loch, linked to the Grangemouth Refinery via a  pipeline.

Navy use

The eastern shore is also the location of the Royal Naval Armaments Depot Coulport, part of His Majesty's Naval Base, Clyde, and the Glen Mallan jetty, linked to Defence Munitions Glen Douglas.

A testing range for torpedoes was established on the loch in 1912, in connection with the Clyde Torpedo Factory in Greenock. It operated through both World Wars, closing in 1986. The loch contains numerous wrecks.

References

External links

 Gaelic place names of Scotland
 Map showing Loch Long, circa 1600, National Library of Scotland
 Video footage of the old Arrochar steamer pier

Long
Long
Firth of Clyde
Cowal
Wreck diving sites in Scotland